Statistics of Swiss Super League in the 1952–53 season.

Overview
It was contested by 14 teams, and FC Basel won the championship for the first time in the club's history.

League standings

Results

Sources
 Switzerland 1952–53 at RSSSF

Swiss Football League seasons
Swiss
1952–53 in Swiss football